Hlinaia (Hlynne, Glinnoye) is a village in the Slobozia District of Transnistria, Moldova. It has since 1990 been administered as a part of the breakaway Transnistrian Moldovan Republic. In the 19th century, the village was named Glueckstal and was populated by German Lutheran colonists.

References

Villages of Transnistria
Kherson Governorate
Slobozia District